The Sony Xperia 10 II is a mid-range Android smartphone manufactured by Sony Mobile. Part of Sony's Xperia series, it was unveiled alongside the Xperia 1 II on February 24, 2020.

Design
The Xperia 10 II has a plastic frame and Corning Gorilla Glass 6 for the screen and back panel. The earpiece, front-facing camera, notification LED and various sensors are housed in the top bezel. The power button/fingerprint sensor and volume rocker are located on the right side of the device, while the 3.5mm headphone jack is located on the top. The rear cameras are located at the upper left-hand corner of the phone, with the LED flash above. The bottom edge has the primary microphone and a downward-firing speaker next to the USB-C port. It is rated IP65/IP68 dust/water-proof up to 1.5 metres for 30 minutes. Black and white color options were shown at launch; Mint Green and Berry Blue finishes were later introduced in May.

Specifications

Hardware
The device is powered by the Qualcomm Snapdragon 665 SoC and the Adreno 610 GPU. It is available with 4GB of RAM, and 128GB of storage. MicroSD card expansion is supported up to 1TB with a single-SIM or hybrid dual-SIM setup. The display is the same size and resolution as the 10, using a  21:9 1080p display which results in a pixel density of 457ppi, however an OLED panel is used instead of the 10's IPS LCD panel. The 10 II has a 3600mAh battery which can be recharged at up to 18W via the USB-C port. A triple camera setup is present on the rear, with a 12MP primary sensor with PDAF, an 8MP telephoto sensor and an 8MP ultrawide sensor. The front-facing camera has an 8MP sensor.

Software
The Xperia 10 II runs on Android 11.

Can be updated to Android 12 via OTA

A commercial SailfishOS release is available from Jolla.

Notes

References

Android (operating system) devices
Sony smartphones
Mobile phones introduced in 2020
Mobile phones with multiple rear cameras
Mobile phones with 4K video recording